4388 Jürgenstock, provisional designation , is a bright Phocaea asteroid from the inner regions of the asteroid belt, approximately  in diameter. It was discovered on 3 November 1964, by astronomers at Indiana University during the Indiana Asteroid Program at Goethe Link Observatory in Indiana, United States. The assumed S-type asteroid has a short rotation period of 2.8 hours and is rather spherical in shape. It was named for German-Venezuelan astronomer Jürgen Stock. In February 2019, the asteroid occulted the brightest star in the night sky, Sirius.

Orbit and classification 

This asteroid orbits the Sun in the inner asteroid belt at a distance of 1.7–3.0 AU once every 3 years and 7 months (1,307 days; semi-major axis of 2.34 AU). Its orbit has an eccentricity of 0.28 and an inclination of 25° with respect to the ecliptic. The body's observation arc begins with its first observation at the Purple Mountain Observatory in Nanking, China, just four nights prior to its official discovery observation at Goethe Link.

Jürgenstock is a member of the Phocaea family, a large collisional family of nearly 2000 stony asteroids, which is named after 25 Phocaea. As with the Hungarias, many Phocaeans are also Mars-crossers due to their eccentric orbits. Moreover, in an alternative HCM-analysis by Milani and Knežević, it has been considered a background asteroid rather than a member of the Phocaea family.

Naming 

This minor planet was named after German-Venezuelan astronomer Jürgen Stock (born 1923), prominent developer of observatories and director of both the South American Cerro Tololo and the Llano del Hato National Astronomical Observatory in Chile and Venezuela, respectively. The official  was published by the Minor Planet Center on 28 September 1999.

Occultation of Sirius

On 19 February 2019, between 5:11 and 5:32 UTC, Jürgenstock occulted the star Sirius in the constellation Canis Major, the brightest star in the night sky. The shadow crossed Southern Argentina, Southern Chile, Central America, and the Caribbean. Occultations are typically an excellent method to determine a minor planet's dimension (cross-section) by exactly measuring the duration of the event.

Physical characteristics 

Jürgenstock is an assumed S-type asteroid, in agreement with the Phocea family's overall spectral type.

Rotation period 

In September 2007, a rotational lightcurve of Jürgenstock was obtained from photometric observations by Federico Manzini at the Sozzago Astronomical Station  in Italy. Lightcurve analysis gave a rotation period of  hours with a brightness variation of 0.11 magnitude, indicative of a spherical rather than elongated shape. In July 2014, a similar period determination of  hours and an amplitude of 0.10 magnitude was made by Brian Warner at the Palmer Divide Station  in California. While Manzini and/or Raoul Behrend suspected it to be an asynchronous binary asteroid with a minor-planet moon in its orbit, Warner did not mention any anomalies in the lightcurve, and the Lightcurve Data Base does not flag the body as a potential binary system.

Diameter and albedo 

According to the survey carried out by the NEOWISE mission of NASA's Wide-field Infrared Survey Explorer, Jürgenstock measures 4.69 kilometers in diameter and its surface has a relatively high albedo of 0.32. The Collaborative Asteroid Lightcurve Link assumes a standard albedo for a Phocaean asteroid of 0.23 and calculates a diameter of 5.79 kilometers based on an absolute magnitude of 13.4.

Notes

References

External links 
 Occultation update for (4388) Jurgenstock, IOTA/IOTA-ES
 Asteroid Lightcurve Database (LCDB), query form (info )
 Dictionary of Minor Planet Names, Google books
 Asteroids and comets rotation curves, CdR – Observatoire de Genève, Raoul Behrend
 Discovery Circumstances: Numbered Minor Planets (1)-(5000) – Minor Planet Center
 
 

004388
004388
Named minor planets
19641103